Yalta City Municipality, officially "the territory governed by the Yalta city council", also known as Greater Yalta is one of the 25 regions of the Autonomous Republic of Crimea, a territory recognized by a majority of countries as part of Ukraine but annexed by Russia in 2014 after Crimean parliament voted to hold a referendum where 90 percent of the electorate voted to join Russia. 

It is a resort region, located at the southern shore of Crimea – one of the most famous recreational territories of the former Soviet Union. Population:

Administrative and municipal status

Within the framework of administrative divisions of Russia, Yalta is, together with a number of urban and rural localities, incorporated separately as the town of republican significance of Yalta—an administrative unit with the status equal to that of the districts. As a municipal division, the town of republican significance of Yalta is incorporated as Yalta Urban Okrug.

Within the framework of administrative divisions of Ukraine, Yalta is incorporated as the town of republican significance of Yalta. Its governing body, Yalta miskrada (Yalta city council) was governing the territory what is described here as Yalta Urban Okrug.

Besides the cities of Yalta and Alupka, the region includes 21 towns and 9 villages which are organised into 7 town communities.

Former Crimean Tatar names which were officially changed in 1945-49 after the deportation of Crimean Tatars and are now used only by the Crimean Tatar community are mentioned in brackets.

Places of interest
 Nikitsky Botanical Garden (Nikita)
 International children's centre of Artek (Gurzuf)
 Livadia Palace (Livadiya)
 Vorontsov Palace (Alupka)

See also
 Yalta Raion

References

 
Municipalities of Crimea